Senator Hickman may refer to:

John W. Hickman (born 1939), Utah State Senate
Richard Hickman (1757–1832), Kentucky State Senate